József Komatits (6 November 1950 – 19 June 2007) was a Hungarian foil fencer. He competed in the individual and team foil events at the 1976 Summer Olympics.

References

External links
 

1950 births
2007 deaths
Hungarian male foil fencers
Olympic fencers of Hungary
Fencers at the 1976 Summer Olympics
Sportspeople from Szombathely